The III National Assembly of Venezuela was a meeting of the legislative branch of Venezuelan federal government, comprising the National Assembly of Venezuela. It met in Caracas after 2010 Venezuelan parliamentary election.

Major events
Crisis in Venezuela
2014 Venezuelan protests

Leadership

Color codes

Members

Representatives per state

See also 

 I National Assembly of Venezuela
 II National Assembly of Venezuela
 IV National Assembly of Venezuela

References

National Assembly (Venezuela)